Runa Rizvi is an Indian classical and Bollywood playback singer. She sings Sufi songs, folk, Bollywood movies etc.

Early life
Runa Rizvi was born in Bombay to Indian singers Rajkumar Rizvi and Indrani Rizvi. She graduated from Mithibai College, Mumbai.

She belongs to the Kalavant gharana and has been trained in classical, semi-classical and light classical music and can sing Hindi film songs, ghazals, thumri, Folk, Punjabi and Sufi Music, as well as Western and Pop music.

Runa Rizvi is married to percussionist Sivamani.

Career
She sang for the Rajshri film Uff kya jaadu mohabbat hai along with Kunal Ganjawala . She sang a song, Jaane tu mera kya hai (Aditi), for the movie Jaane Tu Ya Jaane Na. In 2011, Runa has rendered playback for the film Provoked starring Aishwarya Rai.

She also worked with Prem Joshua and his band for their album, Luminous Secrets.

References

External links

1979 births
Living people
Indian Muslims
Indian women playback singers
Bollywood playback singers
21st-century Indian women singers
21st-century Indian singers